Monument of Hungarian Boy (Polish: Pomnik Chłopca Węgierskiego; Hungarian: A Pesti srác szobra) is a statue by Richárd Juha in Szczecin, Poland located in the Jan Kasprowicz Park. It was completed on 9 December 2016. The monument was financed by the council of Csepel, a district of Budapest, Hungary on the 60th anniversary of the Hungarian Revolution of 1956, as a acknowledgment of the aid of Szczecin inhabitants to Budapest population during the revolution. It was proposed by Szilárd Németh, a membet of the National Assembly of Hungary. In Csepel is located the identical twin statue.

References 

2016 establishments in Poland
2016 sculptures
Monuments and memorials in Poland
Buildings and structures in Szczecin
Monuments and memorials in Szczecin
Outdoor sculptures in Poland
Sculptures of men
Statues in Poland
Hungary–Poland relations
Hungarian Revolution of 1956
Csepel